Ramandeep Singh (born 13 April 1997) is an Indian cricketer. He made his Twenty20 debut for Punjab in the 2016–17 Inter State Twenty-20 Tournament on 29 January 2017. He made his List A debut on 5 October 2019, for Punjab in the 2019–20 Vijay Hazare Trophy. He made his first-class debut on 12 February 2020, for Punjab in the 2019–20 Ranji Trophy. In February 2022, he was bought by the Mumbai Indians in the auction for the 2022 Indian Premier League tournament.

References

External links
 

1997 births
Living people
Indian cricketers
Punjab, India cricketers
Mumbai Indians cricketers
Cricketers from Chandigarh